Dina Sfat, born Dina Kutner (28 October 1938 – 20 March 1989) was a Brazilian actress born to Polish Jewish immigrants. She appeared in 46 films and television shows between 1966 and 1989. Sfat was married to actor Paulo José with whom she had three daughters including actresses Bel Kutner and Ana Kutner. She also participated in 19 theater performances from 1963 to 1986. Additionally, Sfat appeared in 16 TV soap operas from 1966 to 1988, the last one called Baby on Board, transmitted by TV Globo.

Selected filmography
 Macunaíma (1969)
 Tati (1973)
 Heart and Guts (1982)

References

External links

1938 births
1989 deaths
Brazilian people of Polish-Jewish descent
Brazilian film actresses
Deaths from breast cancer
Deaths from cancer in Rio de Janeiro (state)
Actresses from São Paulo
Brazilian Jews
Brazilian television actresses
20th-century Brazilian actresses